Pulau Sebang is a mukim and town in Alor Gajah District, Malacca, Malaysia, which borders Tampin town of Tampin District, Negeri Sembilan.

Infrastructures 
 Aleyah Kuala Ina Mosque
 Mydin Pulau Sebang
 SMK Sultan Mansor Shah
 Pulau Sebang/Tampin railway station

Transportation

 Pulau Sebang/Tampin railway station - One of two railway stations serving the State of Malacca and formerly one of the termini of the Tampin-Malacca Line, which was dismantled by Japanese Forces during World War II. (The other being Batang Melaka railway station.)

See also
 Batang Melaka
 List of cities and towns in Malaysia by population
 Tampin (town)

References

Mukims of Malacca